Natália Kelly (stylized as NATáLIA KELLY) is the debut album of the Austrian singer Natália Kelly. It was worldwide released on 12 April 2013.

Singles 
 "Shine" was released as the lead single of the album on 11 January 2013. It represented Austria in the Eurovision Song Contest 2013.
 "Face the Day" was announced as the second single of the album on 25 June 2013.

Track listing 
Face the Day – 3:29
Shine – 2:59
Lucky One – 3:48
Start Over – 3:10
I Don't Care – 3:01
Breaking Point – 3:23
Till We Meet Again – 3:45
Static – 4:35
Cold – 2:59
Farewell – 3:56
Fallout – 3:25
Without You – 2:36
Last Goodbye – 3:54

Release history

References 

2013 debut albums
Universal Music Group albums